The Czech Rugby Player of the Year (Ragbista roku) is awarded to the player voted the best in the Czech Republic.

The awards have grown since 2001. They are presented at an evening ceremony.
 2001: Coach of the Year and U20 Talent of the Year
 2002: Referee of the Year
 2005: Rugby Event of the Year
 2008: Woman Player of the Year and Woman U20 Talent of the Year
 2009: Personality of Domestic Competition
 2010: Sevens Player of the Year
 2013: National Player of the Year and Miss Rugby
 2014: U18 Talent of the Year
 2015: U16 Talent of the Year

History
It was first awarded in 1972 with Jiří Skall senior, father of former international prop Jiří Skall, as the inaugural winner.

Winners

Trivia
 Vlastimil and Martin Jágr are a father-and-son combination who have both won the award. Vlastimil Jágr won in 1978 and 1980. Martin Jágr won five times in 2004, 2005, 2007, 2008, and 2009.
 Bruno Kudrna won six times. his son Jan Kudrna won U20 Talent in 2003.
 Jan Macháček won in two categories. He won the Player of the Year five times in 1994, 1996, 1998, 2000, and 2001 and one time the Personality of the Domestic Competition in 2010.
 Antonín Brabec won in three categories. He won the Player of the Year in 1995 and the Coach of the Year in 2010 and 2011. He won as organizer of the Rugby Event of the Year in 2010 with the legendary international tournament Prague Beach 5s.
 Martin Kafka won in two categories. He won the Player of the Year in 2002 and the Coach of the Year in 2008 and 2009.

Other categories

Sevens Player of the Year

Woman Player of the Year

Talent of the Year

Coach of the Year

Referee of the Year

National Team Player of the Year

Personality of Domestic Competition

Event of the Year

Miss Rugby

References

Rugby union trophies and awards